The Douglas Glacier is a glacier in New Zealand's Southern Alps located between Mount Sefton and Mount Brunner. It is named after the explorer Charles Edward Douglas.

The glacier sits in a valley and is fed by materials  consisting of many streams and frequent avalanches which drop from its névé  down a cliff face of over 1,000 feet. The glacier itself was approximately 5 miles long in 1908. The glacier has a relatively high rate of moraine materials, consisting of "friable phyllites and schistose grauwackes".

At the foot of the glacier is a lake that was created by glacier recession. Reports from 1892 and 1934 indicated it had "an anomalously slow lake development".  The Douglas River (formerly known as the Twain) begins in the lake at the foot of the glacier.

References

Geography of the West Coast, New Zealand
Glaciers of New Zealand